Euphorbus (Ancient Greek: Εὔφορβος Euphorbos) was the Greek physician of Juba II. He wrote that a succulent plant, similar to the Euphorbia, was a powerful laxative. In 12 BC, Juba named this plant after his physician Euphorbus in response to Augustus dedicating a statue to Antonius Musa, Augustus's own personal physician and Euphorbus' brother. 

Botanist and taxonomist Carl Linnaeus assigned the name Euphorbia to the entire genus in the physician's honor.

References

1st-century BC Greek physicians